"Envy" is a single released by Northern Irish rock band Ash. The song was one of two new songs on their compilation album Intergalactic Sonic 7″s, released in September 2002. The single reached number 21 on the UK Singles Chart and number 41 in Ireland when released in August 2002. The music video featured Andy Dick driving a taxi cab, screaming at the band to get out of his cab.

Track listing
3 Track CD 1
 "Envy"
 "I Don't Mind"
 "Bad Karma Blues"

3 Track CD 2
 "Envy"
 "Tonight You Belong To Me"
 "I Shall Not Die"

2 Track Promo CDINFEC119CDSP
 Envy
 Envy (Vocal Up Version)

7-inch vinyl
 "Envy"
 "Bad Karma Blues"
 "I Shall Not Die"
 "I Don't Mind"

Charts

References

2000 songs
2002 singles
Ash (band) songs
Infectious Records singles
Song recordings produced by Dave Eringa
Songs written by Tim Wheeler